The Militärhistorisches Museum der Bundeswehr – Flugplatz Berlin-Gatow (Bundeswehr Museum of Military History – Berlin-Gatow Airfield; formally known as Luftwaffenmuseum der Bundeswehr), is the Berlin branch of the Bundeswehr Military History Museum. The museum acts as an independent military department.

The museum is in Berlin at a former Luftwaffe and Royal Air Force (RAF) airfield, RAF Gatow. The focus is on military history, particularly the history of the post-war German Air Force. The museum has a collection of more than 200,000 items, including 155 aeroplanes, 5,000 uniforms and 30,000 books. There are also displays (including aeroplanes) on the history of the airfield when it was used by the RAF.

Aircraft include World War I planes such as the Fokker E.III as reproductions, and World War II planes such as the Bf 109, as well as at least one aircraft of every type ever to serve in the air forces of East and West Germany. Most of those postwar aircraft are stored outside on the tarmac and runways, however, and many are in bad condition. There are long term restoration projects, including a Focke-Wulf Fw 190. Because of that the museum is under construction, some exhibits are shortly removed for restoration, repainting or lending to other museums.

History 
The museum traces its beginnings to 1957, when a former government official named Helmut Jaeckel started acquiring the personal collections of Wehrmacht soldiers and displaying them at Uetersen Airfield. In 1963 a board of trustees was founded to run the new museum. However, due to financial difficulties, operation of the museum was handed over to the Bundeswehr in 1987. From 1995 to 1996 the museum was relocated to the former airbase at RAF Gatow.

Buildings

Collection

Aeroplanes up to 1945

NATO Aeroplanes

Warsaw Pact Aeroplanes

Helicopters

Unmanned systems

Anti-aircraft and radar systems

Vehicles

Engines

References

External links 

 MHM Flugplatz Berlin-Gatow
 Förderverein des Luftwaffenmuseums der Bundeswehr e.V.
 Luftwaffenmuseum der Bundeswehr Berlin-Gatow
 Picture gallery
 "Arbeitsgruppe historische Luftfahrttechnik Daedalus"

Military and war museums in Germany
Aerospace museums in Germany
German Air Force
Museums in Berlin